Shinrin-kōen Station is the name of two train stations in Japan:

 Shinrin-Kōen Station (Hokkaido) in Hokkaido
 Shinrinkōen Station (Saitama) in Saitama Prefecture